Swara (Notes) is an upcoming Sri Lankan Sinhala adult drama film directed by Sanjaya Nirmal and co-produced by Nita Fernando, Chandran Ratnam, Manohan Nanayakkara and Rohan Welivita. It film star ensemble cast where Nita Fernando and Sachini Ayendra in lead roles along with Anusha Rajapakse, Kanchana Kodithuwakku and Nadeeka Gunasekara in supportive roles. Music composed by Ranga Dassanayake.

Plot

Cast
 Nita Fernando
 Sachini Ayendra
 Anusha Rajapakse
 Kanchana Kodithuwakku
 Damitha Abeyratne
 Jeewan Kumaranatunga
 Sriyantha Mendis
 Mahendra Weerarathna
 Mercy Edirisinghe
 Nadeeka Gunasekara
 Daminda Porage
 Charith Abeysinghe
 Iranganie Serasinghe
 Mahendra Perera
 Semini Iddamalgoda
 Sarath Kothalawala
 Buddhika Jayaratne
 Upeksha Swarnamali
 Sriyani Kodithuwakku
 Menaka Rajapakse
 Sanjeewani Weerasinghe
 Nanda Mahawatte
 Chula Padmendra Kumarapathirana
 Veena Jayakody
 Asela Jayakody
 Kuma Aththanayake
 Sanjewwa Dissanayake
 Danu Innasithamby

References

External links
 Swara on YouTube

Sinhala-language films